The Joe Namath Show is a 1969 talk show hosted by Joe Namath and Dick Schaap. It premiered on October 6, 1969 and lasted one season with 13 episodes.

References

External links

American television talk shows
English-language television shows
1969 American television series debuts
1969 American television series endings